Fiji's President, Ratu Sir Kamisese Mara resigned under duress on May 29, 2000, and handed power over to Commodore Frank Bainimarama. In what politicians have called a "coup within a coup," Ratu Mara was whisked away on a warship on May 28, where he was allegedly approached by a group of present and former military and police officers who ordered him to suspend the Constitution.  When he refused, ("If the Constitution goes, I go," he defiantly declared) the group, including Bainimarama, former Prime Minister and 1987 Coup Leader Sitiveni Rabuka, former military commander Ratu Epeli Ganilau (a son-in-law of Mara's), and former Police Commissioner Isikia Savua, are said to have forced Mara's resignation.  He was subsequently taken to his home island in the Lau Islands.

Chaudhry, for his part, has claimed that Ilisoni Ligairi, Speight's security chief, told him that Savua and former Prime Minister Rabuka were involved in the planning of the coup. "Ligairi can't lie as he was very much involved and is now awaiting trial at Nukulau Island," Chaudhry said.

The military regime that took over appointed Ratu Josefa Iloilo as president.
After the coup had been quashed, the High Court ruled on 15 October 2000 that Mara's replacement was unconstitutional and ordered his reinstatement, but Mara decided to spare the country further constitutional trauma by resigning officially, with his resignation retroactive to May 29, 2000.

On May 21, 2003, the Police Investigations Department confirmed that they had opened an investigation into the resignation of Ratu Mara.

The Police declared in 2003 that they were facing many challenges in their investigation, finding many officers uncooperative.  Then on 30 April 2004, Police spokesman Mesake Koroi, said that a lot of hearsay and rumours were going around that would not stand up in court.  Many witnesses were refusing to talk.  "Unfortunately we are hitting a brick wall in our investigations at the moment," Koroi said.  Commissioner Hughes revealed on 5 January 2006 that this investigation was legally complex and was being hampered by the lack of cooperation of various witnesses.

References

Bibliography

 Trnka, S. (2011). State of Suffering: Political Violence and Community Survival in Fiji. United States: Cornell University Press.,  
 Pretes, M. (2008). Coup: Reflections on the Political Crisis in Fiji. United States: ANU E Press.,  
Baba, T., Nabobo-Baba, U., Field, M. (2005). Speight of Violence: Inside Fiji's 2000 Coup. Australia: Pandanus Books.,  

2000 in Fiji
2000 Fijian coup d'état
Fiji and the Commonwealth of Nations
Politics of Fiji